Midland station may refer to:

United Kingdom

Bedford railway station, previously known as Bedford Midland Road station
Derby railway station, also known as Derby Midland station
Leyton Midland Road railway station
Nottingham station, previously known as Nottingham Midland station

Midland station, an alternative name for St Pancras railway station
Sheffield station, previously known as Sheffield Midland station

Elsewhere

Midland railway station, Perth, Western Australia, Australia
Midland station (Toronto), a rapid transit station in Toronto, Ontario, Canada